George Stephen Kempis (25 November 1871 – 17 March 1948) was a cricketer who played first-class cricket for Transvaal from 1892 to 1894.

A medium-pace bowler, his best bowling performance came in Transvaal's match against Griqualand West in 1892–93, when he opened the bowling in the second innings and took 4 for 34. He toured England with the first South African touring team in 1894, when no first-class matches were played, but he had little success.

His elder brother Gus played in South Africa's inaugural Test match in 1889.

References

External links

1871 births
1948 deaths
South African cricketers
Gauteng cricketers
Cricketers from Port Elizabeth